Sainthal is a name of a number of localities in India:

 Sainthal, Rajasthan
 Sainthal, Uttar Pradesh